John Stapleton may refer to:

John Stapleton (Australian journalist) (born 1952), Australian journalist
John Stapleton (English journalist) (born 1946), English journalist and broadcaster
John Stapleton (MP) (1816–1891), English Liberal Party politician who sat in the House of Commons between 1852 and 1874
John Stapleton (fl.1406), MP for Midhurst (UK Parliament constituency)
John Stapleton (fl.1421), MP for Shropshire (UK Parliament constituency)
John Stapleton (playwright), collaborator in the adaptation of A Gentleman of Leisure